Samuel Thomas Bateman was a member of the Ohio House of Representatives from 1985 until 2000, when he was forced by term limits to step down.  His district consisted of a portion of Adams County, Ohio.  He was succeeded by Jean Schmidt.

References

1936 births
Republican Party members of the Ohio House of Representatives
2001 deaths
20th-century American politicians